Marcel Welten (born 23 June 1969) is a Dutch bobsledder. He competed in the two man and the four man events at the 2002 Winter Olympics.

References

External links
 

1969 births
Living people
Dutch male bobsledders
Olympic bobsledders of the Netherlands
Bobsledders at the 2002 Winter Olympics
Sportspeople from Utrecht (city)